Paris Alejandro Adot Barandiaran (born 26 February 1990) is a Spanish professional footballer who plays as a right back for SD Ponferradina.

Club career
Born in Pamplona, Navarre, Adot made his senior debut with SD Lagunak in the 2009–10 season, in the regional leagues. In 2010 he joined Cádiz CF, being assigned to the reserves in Tercera División.

In 2012, after playing as a winger for UD Mutilvera and scoring a career-best seven goals, Adot signed for CD Izarra in Segunda División B. On 30 June 2013, he moved to another reserve team, CA Osasuna B in division four.

On 1 September 2014, Adot returned to Izarra, with the side now in the fourth division. The following 3 July, he moved to CD Tudelano in the third level, and continued to appear in the category in the following three seasons, representing Real Murcia, CE Sabadell FC and CD Mirandés; with the latter, he achieved promotion to Segunda División in 2019.

On 4 July 2019, free agent Adot agreed to a two-year deal with second division side AD Alcorcón. He made his professional debut on 18 August, starting in a 1–0 away defeat of CD Numancia.

On 24 August 2020, Adot terminated his contract with the Alfareros, and signed for fellow league team SD Ponferradina the following day.

References

External links

1990 births
Living people
Footballers from Pamplona
Spanish footballers
Association football defenders
Segunda División players
Segunda División B players
Tercera División players
Divisiones Regionales de Fútbol players
Cádiz CF B players
UD Mutilvera players
CD Izarra footballers
CA Osasuna B players
CD Tudelano footballers
Real Murcia players
CE Sabadell FC footballers
CD Mirandés footballers
AD Alcorcón footballers
SD Ponferradina players